Edoson Silva Martins (born March 16, 1974) is a former Brazilian football player.

Club statistics

References

External links

1974 births
Living people
Brazilian footballers
Brazilian expatriate footballers
Expatriate footballers in Japan
J1 League players
Kashima Antlers players
Association football midfielders